Petroto (Greek: Πετρωτό) may refer to several places in Greece:

 Petroto, Achaea, a village in Achaea 
 Petroto, Karditsa, the site of the ancient village Pereia, Phthiotis, ancient Thessaly
 Petroto, Larissa, a village in Elassona
 Petroto, Phthiotis, a village in Phthiotis 
 Petroto, Trikala, a village in Oichalia, Trikala
 Petroto, Thessaloniki, a village in Thessaloniki regional unit
 Petroto, a village in Platanos, Aetolia-Acarnania